Ardisia escallonioides, the Island marlberry, is a plant species native to the West Indies and neighboring areas. It has been reported from Barbados, Bermuda, the Dominican Republic, Cuba, Mexico, Belize, Guatemala and Florida.

Ardisia escallonioides is a shrub or tree up to 15 m (50 feet) tall. It has elliptic leaves up to 17 cm (7 inches) long. Flowers are borne in a panicle of up to 20 flowers. Each flower is white to pink, up to 7 mm (0.3 inches) across. Fruits are fleshy drupes up to 7 mm (0.3 inches) across, red at first then turning black.

Uses
Fruits of A. escallonioides are reported to be edible, but some consider the taste to be unpleasant.

References

escallonioides
Flora of Barbados
Flora of Bermuda
Flora of the Dominican Republic
Flora of Cuba
Flora of Mexico
Flora of Belize
Flora of Guatemala
Flora of Florida
Flora without expected TNC conservation status